Lahko kolesno oklepno vozilo Valuk (LKOV, "Light wheeled armoured vehicle") is an improved version of Pandur 6X6 APC (armored personnel carrier), manufactured under a license manufacturing agreement with the Austrian company, Steyr Daimler Puch Spezialfahrzeug AG & Co KG (now part of General Dynamics Land Systems – Europe), by Sistemska Tehnika of Slovenia for the Slovenian Army.

It is named after the Carantanian duke Valuk.

Design

Weapon systems 
The transport version of vehicle is equipped either with 12.7 mm machine gun or 40 mm automatic grenade launcher. Mortar-carrier version carries CARDOM 120 mm mortar.

The scout version of vehicle is equipped with a stabilised Overhead Weapon Station supplied by the Rafael Israel Armament Development Authority. The Overhead Weapon Station OWS-25 is armed with a 25 mm Bushmaster automatic cannon and a 7.62 mm coaxial machine gun. The weapon station can also be fitted with externally mounted TOW long-range anti-tank guided missiles.

Command, control, and targeting systems 
The gunner can survey, acquire and track a target, aim and fire from inside the turret with a closed hatch or in a head-out position. The gunner's station is equipped with a day and night periscope sighting. The day periscope sight has a unity magnification window with a collimated aiming circle and an 8× magnification sight with a ballistic reticle. The night periscope sight has a unity magnification window and an image intensifier x7.5 magnification passive night elbow.

The main components of observation system are:
 Doppler radar (optional; 48 km of max detection radius)
 Electro-optical subsystems: CCD camera (effective distance up to 20 km), FLIR and laser distance measurer
 LTD (laser target designator)
 GPS
 BMS (battle management system)
 UHF/VHF radio station
 integrated electric generator (optional)

Self-protection 
The standard armoured protection is rated to withstand 7.62 mm armour-piercing rounds through a full 360 degrees, and 12.7 mm armour-piercing rounds over a 30-degree frontal arc.

Rafael has supplied a passive add-on ceramic armour kit for the Valuk which provides 12.7 mm AP round protection over the full 360 degrees.

The crew door at the rear of the vehicle is equipped with a periscope sight. The crew is protected against anti-tank and anti-personnel mines and a full nuclear, biological and chemical warfare protection system is fitted. The crew compartment is fitted with an automatic fire detection and fire fighting system with 3 fire sensors and three Halon 1301 gas containers.

A version of the Valuk has been built with a rear ramp with an emergency door instead of two doors. The vehicle can also be equipped with a capstan type cable winch.

Engine 
The Valuk is equipped with a Steyr 612.35 6-cylinder turbo diesel engine and a hydrodynamically controlled automatic transmission with a torque converter and lock-up clutch with 5 forward and 1 reverse gear. The engine provides a power-to-weight ratio of 20.4 kW per ton.

The 6x6 wheels have automatic tyre pressure regulation with a central tyre inflation system. The independent suspension system has telescopic shock absorbers on each wheel. There are coil springs on the first and second axle and torsion bars on the third axle.

The drive train and steering linkages are protected within the hull of the vehicle.

Mobility 
The turning radius is 8.5 metres and the maximum speed is typically 100 kilometres per hour. The ground clearance is 430 mm. The vehicle can negotiate natural and man made obstacles such as trenches up to 1.5 metres wide, vertical obstacles to 0.5 metres high, gradients of 70 per cent and side slope to 40 per cent. The Valuk can ford water to a depth of 1.2 metres. The combat weight is 13,300 kilograms.

Versions 
As with most modern infantry fighting vehicles, a number of versions and roles are available:
 Transport version
 Crew: 3+6
 Armaments: 12.7 mm machine gun or 40 mm automatic grenade launcher
 Ambulance version
 Crew: 3+4/(2+3)/6
 Armaments: none
 Mortar-carrier version
 Crew: 2+2
 Armaments: CARDOM 120 mm mortar
 Scout version
 Crew: 3
 Armaments: 25 mm M242 Bushmaster automatic cannon and a 7.62 mm coaxial machine gun, fitted using a RAFAEL Rafael Overhead Weapon Station (OWS-25)

Operators 
  – 85 Vehicles

References

External links 
 Official Website

Armoured fighting vehicles of the post–Cold War period
Six-wheeled vehicles
Armoured personnel carriers of the post–Cold War period
Wheeled armoured personnel carriers